Yuhara (written: 湯原) is a Japanese surname. Notable people with the surname include:

, Japanese rugby union player
, Japanese golfer

Japanese-language surnames